Costa Oriental del Lago de Maracaibo (in English Eastern Coast of Maracaibo Lake) is a metropolitan area and subregion, that includes 7 municipalities of Zulia state. It's the main traditional area of the oil industry in Zulia and where most oilfield operations are based. It's bordered to the west by Lake Maracaibo, the east with the states of Falcón and Lara, the north with the Gulf of Venezuela, and the south with Trujillo state. The "COL" conurbation has 758,957 inhabitants, while the "COL" as a subregion has 910,752 inhabitants.

Cities
It is a densely populated area covering approximately one third of the population of Zulia state (almost one million), with 2 large cities and numerous towns and villages. The principal cities of the area are:

 Cabimas (pop. 280,171)
 Ciudad Ojeda (pop. 152,890)
 Mene Grande (pop. 61,960)
 Los Puertos de Altagracia (pop. approx. 56,210)
 Lagunillas (pop. 53,717)
 Bachaquero (pop. 48,402)
 Santa Rita (pop. 30,777)
 El Danto (pop. 30,022)
 Tía Juana (pop. 24,775)
 Sabaneta de Palmas (pop. 20,033)

Municipalities
The 7 municipalities of the area are:

See also
 List of metropolitan areas of Venezuela

References
 Humberto Ochoa Urdaneta. (1995). Memoria Geográfica de la Costa Oriental del Lago de Maracaibo.
 Emilio Strauss, William Fuenmayor, José Romero. (2000). Atlas del Estado Zulia.
 https://web.archive.org/web/20121107023045/http://www.ine.gov.ve/seccion/menuprincipal.asp?nedo=24&Entid=230000&seccion=1&nvalor=1_1

Geography of Zulia
Metropolitan areas of Venezuela